Aguazul is a town and municipality in the Department of Casanare, Colombia. Its economy is dependent on oil, mainly Cupiagua and Cusiana fields. Other important products of its economy are livestock and rice. As of 2004, Leonel Torres has been mayor of the city.

History

"La Violencia" 
During the time known as La Violencia, or "The Violence", Aguazul, as well as most of Casanare, was controlled by liberal guerrillas. The region was a political and military zone of influence, even being declared independent by the promulgation of the Vega Perdida Constitution.

In those times, Aguazul was known as Sevilla and was an important trade center and one of the few passage ways for livestock for the inner meat market.

The city was destroyed by the Colombian Air Force bombardments and was rebuilt in the same location but across the river.

Armed conflict 
Traditionally the zone was controlled by the leftist Ejército de Liberación Nacional. During the 1995-1998 time period, it was subject to intense combat and a scenario of continuing murder perpetrated by paramilitary groups, which succeeded in gaining control of the area.

The presence of the paramilitary group Autodefensas Campesinas de Casanare, whose base of operations was in the nearby municipalities of Villanueva and Monterrey, was a constant until 2004 when the group surrendered the zone to the Autodefensas Unidas de Colombia AUC, in a battle which is said to have cost more than 3.000 lives.

Climate
Aguazul has a tropical monsoon climate (Am) with moderate to little rainfall from December to March and heavy to very heavy rainfall from April to November.

Born in Aguazul 
 Frank Ramírez, Colombian actor

References

External links 
  Aguazul official website

Municipalities of Casanare Department